Events from the year 1752 in Denmark.

Incumbents
 Monarch – Frederick V
 Prime minister – Johan Ludvig Holstein-Ledreborg

Events

 January  The castrum doloris of Louise in Christiansborg Chapel.
 8 July  The wedding of Frederick V and Juliana Maria of Brunswick-Wolfenbüttel.

Undated

Births
 12 March – Frederik Christian Winsløw, medal engraver (died 1811)
 31 March – Erich Erichsen, merchant and ship-owner (died (1837)
 6 October – Jens Friedenreich Hage, merchant and landowner (died 1831)
 8 October – Grímur Jónsson Thorkelin, scholar, archivist (died 1829)

Deaths
 24 October  – Christian Falster, poet and philologist (born 1690)

References

 
1750s in Denmark
Denmark
Years of the 18th century in Denmark